George Glover "Buck" MacDonald (June 5, 1894 – March 1, 1985) was an American football guard in the National Football League for the Canton Bulldogs, New York Brickley Giants and the Tonawanda Kardex. He attended Lehigh University. Buck was the first Nova Scotian NFL player. He started his career for the Canton Bulldogs where he played 2 games before joining the New York Brickley Giants and later the Tonawanda Kardex.

References

1894 births
1985 deaths
Sportspeople from Nova Scotia
Canadian players of American football
American football offensive guards
Lehigh Mountain Hawks football players
New York Brickley Giants players
Tonawanda Kardex players
People from Pictou County